The 1936 Richmond Spiders football team was an American football team that represented the University of Richmond as a member of the Southern Conference (SoCon) during the 1936 college football season. In their third season under head coach Glenn Thistlethwaite, Richmond compiled a 4–4–2 record, with a mark of 1–3 in conference play, finishing in 13th place in the SoCon.

Schedule

References

Richmond
Richmond Spiders football seasons
Richmond Spiders football